Ras El Agba  is a town and commune in the Guelma Province of Algeria. According to the 1998 census it has a population of 2,348.

References

Communes of Guelma Province
Cities in Algeria
Algeria